Heterauge is a genus of snout moths. It was described by George Hampson in 1906, and contains the species Heterauge sarcalis. It is found in Brazil.

References

Chrysauginae
Monotypic moth genera
Moths of South America
Pyralidae genera